Guzmania ventricosa is a plant species in the genus Guzmania. This species is endemic to Venezuela.

References

ventricosa
Flora of Venezuela